Paryphanta is a genus of land snails in the family Rhytididae. Species from New Zealand are known commonly as kauri snails (Māori: pūpūrangi). They are closely related and similar to snails in the genus Powelliphanta, which was formerly included within Paryphanta.

There are just two species of Paryphanta: Paryphanta busbyi and Paryphanta watti, which occur from North Cape to West Auckland.

P. watti occurs only at the extreme northern end of this range near Kaeo. This form is of much darker coloration and often smaller, although does reach the same size as P. busbyi if allowed to reach old age.

See also
 Paryphanta busbyi
 Paryphanta watti

References

Further reading 
Powell A. W. B., New Zealand Mollusca, William Collins Publishers Ltd, Auckland, New Zealand 1979 

Rhytididae